Church Boys United (formally known as Church Boys FC) is a Nepali football club from the Koteshwor neighborhood of Kathmandu that competes in the Martyr's Memorial A-Division League.
The club was first promoted to Martyr's Memorial A-Division League in 2022, having won the 2022 Martyr's Memorial B-Division League.

History
The club was founded in 2009, but only participated in local tournaments. In 2019, they qualified for the Martyr's Memorial C-Division League which was their fifth attempt in C-Division League Qualifier (previously known as Martyr's Memorial 'D' Division League) and were promoted to the top-level Martyr's Memorial A-Division League within two seasons, in what The Kathmandu Post called "a remarkable journey".

Record by seasons
The season-by-season performance of Church Boys United. Until 2019, the team only participated in local tournaments, while attempting to qualify for the third tier Martyr's Memorial C-Division League. The earliest qualification was in 2012.

Personnel

Kit Manufacturer and Sponsors

Honours

National 

 Martyr's Memorial B-Division League
 Champions (1): 2022
 Martyr's Memorial C-Division League
 Champions (1): 2021

Current squad

Former players 

  Bimal Gharti Magar

External links 

 Official Website

References 

Football clubs in Nepal